Kraken Black Spiced Rum is a Caribbean black spiced rum. It is distributed in the United States by Proximo Spirits, and named after the kraken, a mythical giant squid-like sea monster.

Product description and packaging
Kraken Rum was introduced in 2010. The base rum is from Trinidad, distilled from molasses made from sugar cane. The rum is aged 1–2 years and then blended with a mix of 11 spices, including cinnamon, ginger and clove. The liquid is black, revealing hints of brown when held up to the light.

The bottle is styled after a Victorian rum bottle, with two hoop handles based on the tradition of hanging a bottle to prevent breakages. The bottle has a black and white paper label featuring an illustration of a giant squid captioned with its scientific name, Architeuthis dux. The bottle's back label states that it is "imported rum from the Caribbean blended with natural flavors."

Beginning in 2015, Proximo began selling Kraken Ghost White Rum exclusively in Mexico.

In early 2020, Kraken released two new pre-mixed flavours, Kraken & Dry and Kraken & Cola, increasing its hold on the Australian market.
Kraken's Ceramic Flagons were produced by UK based Pottery firm Wade Ceramics, though ceased contractual agreements in 2020.

Marketing
In 2013, two outdoor 3D billboards went up in Chicago, with a kraken sea creature's giant tentacle pulling a consumer out of an apartment window in an advertisement for Kraken Rum. The ad was created by New York agency Dead As We Know It, which also produced several animated TV spots for the brand, combining 2D and 3D animations in a 19th-century scientific style, as well as an iPhone and Android app, The Kraken: The Simulation Application for Nautical Maneuvering, a game in which players steer a ship through kraken-infested waters. Later that year, Blur Studio created animated spots featuring a kraken destroying a ship to the tune of Bobby Darin's 1959 version of the song "Beyond the Sea".

Kraken Rum was the sponsor of the Kitschies, a British speculative fiction award.

In October 2020 Kraken collaborated with competitive freediver Beci Ryan, because the drinks company announced that it was opening its first underwater 'Dive Thru'. Ryan was tasked to freedive to a treasure chest containing bottles of the new limited edition spiced rum and salvage them. Customers had the opportunity of winning one of these retrieved bottles. In addition Kraken confirmed they would be making a donation of £1 from the sale of every bottle of this rum to Project AWARE. 

Shortly after announcing their team name, the Seattle Kraken ice hockey team announced Kraken Rum as their official rum sponsor.

Honors
Kraken has been named an Impact "Hot Brand" by Impact magazine.

References

External links
Official website

Rums
Alcoholic drink brands
Kraken in popular culture
Brands of Trinidad and Tobago